Hansjörg Haber (born 21 February 1953) is a former German diplomat. From 2015 to 2016 he was head of the Delegation of the European Union in Turkey, and served as Ambassador of the Federal Republic of Germany to Yemen from 2017 to October 2018.

After graduating from Atlantic College in Wales, he studied economics at the University of Munich, where he also worked as a research assistant before joining the German Foreign Service. He held diplomatic roles in Paris, Bern, Moscow, Manila, and Ankara, Beirut, Cairo, Prague, Sana'a, in the German Federal Foreign Office in Bonn and Berlin, and various roles for the European Union.

He is married to the diplomat Emily Haber, with whom he has two children.

References

1953 births
Living people
German diplomats
Ambassadors of Germany
People educated at Atlantic College
People educated at a United World College
Ludwig Maximilian University of Munich alumni

Ambassadors of Germany to Yemen